Northampton station was an elevated rapid transit station located above Washington Street at Massachusetts Avenue in the South End neighborhood of Boston, Massachusetts. It served the Washington Street Elevated, part of the MBTA's Orange Line, from 1901 until 1987.

Massachusetts Avenue station, a street-level bus station on the Washington Street branch of the MBTA Silver Line bus rapid transit service, opened on the site in 2002. It is served by the SL4 and SL5 Silver Line routes as well as several local MBTA bus routes. Like all Silver Line stops, Massachusetts Avenue is accessible.

History

The Washington Street Elevated, including Northampton station, opened as part of the Main Line Elevated on June 10, 1901. It was originally built with a short center island platform, similar to Dover station to the north. Like most of the other Elevated stations, both were designed in a Beaux Arts style by Alexander Wadsworth Longfellow, Jr. Mere months after opening, both stations had their platforms extended for four-car trains; the platforms at Northampton were extended again in 1908 to six-car length. Unlike Dover station, which was completely rebuilt in 1912, Northampton station received no substantial modifications other than the extended platform.

The Main Line Elevated was renamed the Orange Line in 1965. Northampton station was closed on April 30, 1987, when the Washington Street Elevated was closed and the Orange Line was rerouted to the west along the Southwest Corridor. Because it retained its original style, the station building at Northampton was selected for preservation. It was detached from the elevated structure and moved to the Seashore Trolley Museum in Kennebunkport, Maine in 1988. Around 1989, a gas station at the intersection of Massachusetts Avenue and Columbus Avenue was built to resemble the former station.

Silver Line service on Washington Street began on July 20, 2002, replacing the route 49 bus. Service levels doubled on October 15, 2009 with the introduction of the SL4 route.

References

External links

MBTA: Washington St @ Massachusetts Ave northbound and southbound

Silver Line (MBTA) stations
Railway stations in Boston
Orange Line (MBTA) stations
Former MBTA stations in Massachusetts
Railway stations in the United States opened in 1901
Railway stations closed in 1987